The Anji dialect is a dialect of the Wu spoken in the county of Anji in Zhejiang province, China. Anji dialect is the local language spoken by the indigenous people of Anji and is the common language of communication in the county.

Grammar

Pronouns

References 

Sino-Tibetan languages
Wu Chinese
Zhejiang
Chinese language
Anji County
Chinese culture by province